Joshua Huppertz (born 10 November 1994) is a German cyclist, who currently rides for UCI Continental team .

Major results
2017
 3rd International Rhodes Grand Prix
 6th Slag om Norg
2018
 1st Arno Wallaard Memorial
 1st USPE Road Race
 1st USPE Time Trial
 3rd International Rhodes Grand Prix
 7th PWZ Zuidenveld Tour
2019
 5th Overall Tour de Normandie
2021
 1st Stage 1 Czech Cycling Tour
2022
 7th Route Adélie
 8th Visit Friesland Elfsteden Race
 10th Overall Tour du Loir-et-Cher

References

External links

1994 births
Living people
German male cyclists
Sportspeople from Aachen
Cyclists from North Rhine-Westphalia
21st-century German people